Somerset is a town in Bristol County, Massachusetts, United States. The population was 18,303 at the 2020 census. It is the birthplace and hometown of Clifford Milburn Holland (1883–1924), the chief engineer and namesake of the Holland Tunnel in New York City.

History

Somerset was first settled in 1677 on the Shawomet lands, and was officially incorporated in 1790. It was named for Somerset Square in Boston, which was, in turn, named for the county of Somerset in England. It was once a vital shipping point, and after the War of 1812 it was one of America's chief distribution points. In 1872, it became the site of a major coal port, and in the early 20th century a large cannery existed in the town. However, as neighboring Fall River's industry grew, it absorbed much of Somerset's, and the town took on more of a suburban character. In fact, the town's population grew during the Great Depression, as many people from Fall River and other localities moved to the suburb. Today, the town's major industry (other than suburban services) is power generation, with the Montaup Electric Company plant upriver (founded in 1923) and the Brayton Point Power Station at the town's southern tip (founded in 1963). Brayton Point has been the target of much criticism for its pollution problems from burning coal.  It closed May 31, 2017.

Historically, the town has had a connective relationship with Fall River. Originally, Slade's Ferry ran across the Taunton River to connect the two towns since the late 18th century. In the late 19th century, the Slade's Ferry Bridge connected the two towns, from the current southern terminus of Brayton Avenue in Somerset to Brownell Street in Fall River, and was double-decked, with a railroad section on the top level. The bridge was dismantled after closing in 1970 due to its rapid deterioration and its low height. (The path of the old bridge is still somewhat visible; two large sets of power lines cross the river at the same point.) The Brightman Street Bridge just to the north was opened in 1908. A new bridge, named the Veterans Memorial Bridge, was partially completed prior to a dedication ceremony held on September 11, 2011. At first, only the westbound side of the bridge was open to traffic. Since then, both lanes of the bridge have been opened for traffic.

Geography

Somerset is located at  (41.748502, −71.153188). It borders on Mount Hope Bay and Narragansett Bay, and its east border is formed by the Taunton River, an arm of that bay.

Somerset is bordered by Swansea on the west, Dighton on the north, Fall River on the east (across the Taunton River), and Bristol, Rhode Island, to the south. The border with Bristol is located in the middle of the bay. Cities close to Somerset include Fall River, New Bedford, Attleboro, and Providence, and the town is one hour's drive south of Boston.

The town is accessed via Interstate 195, which enters the town via the Braga Bridge from Fall River and has an exit at Route 103. It is also connected via the Veterans Memorial Bridge, the fourth bridge to cross the Taunton River between the town and city. The Veterans Memorial Bridge carries U.S. Route 6 and Route 138 across the river. Route 6 heads east-west towards Swansea, with several shopping plazas along the route. Route 138 travels north from the bridge along County Street, the town's main north-south thoroughfare, towards Dighton. Route 103's eastern terminus lies at the former intersection of Routes 6 and 138 just south of the new bridge. It heads south-southeast for three-quarters of a mile before turning west-northwest towards Swansea, crossing into that town at a bridge over Lee's River. Due to the controversy in Fall River over the proposed building of an LNG terminal, town officials have consider keeping the old Brightman Street Bridge open, as the tankers would not fit through it, and the terminal's proposed site is upriver of the bridges. However, as of the opening of the new bridge, the bridge is closed, as the old roads leading to it on the Fall River side have been removed to make way for the new bridge's ramp system.

Somerset has bus service along Route 6 provided by the Southeastern Regional Transit Authority (SRTA). The nearest regional bus service is in Fall River, and the nearest rail service is in Providence. There are plans in the works to bring commuter rail service to Fall River by 2023, which would give the town rail access to Boston. Until the late 1990s, the nearest airport was in Fall River; however, the airport closed due to various issues.

Demographics

As of the census of 2000, there were 18,234 people, 6,987 households, and 5,261 families residing in the town. The racial makeup of the town was 98.22% White, 0.16% Black or African American, 0.12% Native American, 0.53% Asian, 0.02% Pacific Islander, 0.15% from other races, and 0.79% from two or more races. Hispanic or Latino of any race were 0.49% of the population.

There were 6,987 households, out of which 28.1% had children under the age of 18 living with them, 62.4% were married couples living together, 9.8% had a female householder with no husband present, and 24.7% were non-families. Of all households, 21.5% were made up of individuals, and 12.9% had someone living alone who was 65 years of age or older. The average household size was 2.57 and the average family size was 2.98.

In the town, the population was spread out, with 20.4% under the age of 18, 6.2% from 18 to 24, 26.2% from 25 to 44, 26.2% from 45 to 64, and 21.0% who were 65 years of age or older. The median age was 43 years. For every 100 females, there were 90.0 males. For every 100 females age 18 and over, there were 86.6 males.

The median income for a household in the town was $51,770, and the median income for a family was $60,067. Males had a median income of $42,036 versus $29,851 for females. The per capita income for the town was $22,420. About 3.2% of families and 4.0% of the population were below the poverty line, including 1.8% of those under age 18 and 8.7% of those age 65 or over.

Government

On the state level, Somerset is represented as part of the Fifth Bristol state representative district, which includes Dighton and parts of Swansea and Taunton. In the state senate, Somerset is part of the First Bristol and Plymouth district, which includes Fall River, Freetown, Lakeville, Rochester, Swansea and Westport. Representative Patricia Haddad (D-Somerset) represents Somerset in the State House of Representatives. Senator Michael Rodrigues (D-Westport) represents Somerset in the state senate. On the national level, the town is part of Massachusetts's 4th congressional district, which is represented by Jake Auchincloss. The state's senior Senator is Elizabeth Warren. The state's junior Senator is Ed Markey.

The town's library is located north of the town hall in the center of town, and was expanded for more resource and meeting areas in 2000. The town's historical society is located in the north end of town, and also operates a museum in that location (in the former Village School building). The old Town Hall, to the north of the library, is still in use for various public gatherings. The town is served by one centralized police and fire headquarters, along with a smaller branch fire station in the Brayton Point area which is also trained to handle emergencies at the Brayton Point Power Plant. The town's zip codes are 02725 and 02726, although both are now located in the central post office in the heart of town. The town maintains five parks (Buffington Park, Ashton Field, Waterfront Park, Rock Park, and South Complex Baseball/softball fields), as well as a town beach, Pierce Beach, located next to Pierce Playground along the Taunton River in the north end of town. A sixth park, Slade's Ferry Park, was closed by eminent domain for the right-of-way of the new Brightman Street Bridge being built.

Education
Somerset is served by its own public school system. It has three elementary schools, from north to south they are the North Elementary School, the Chace Street School, and the South Elementary School. A fourth elementary school, Wilbur Elementary School, closed in June 2014 following a majority vote by the school board. Somerset Middle School (formerly known as Somerset Junior High School) is located adjacent to South Elementary along Brayton Avenue, and handles grades 6 through 8. Somerset Berkley Regional High School is located along County Street (Route 138). The school's mascot is the "Blue Raider", and its colors are dark blue and white. The school is known locally for having two former baseball players play professionally, Greg Gagne and Jerry Remy. The town is a member of the Diman Regional Vocational Technical High School system in Fall River, and high school students may also attend Bristol County Agricultural High School in Dighton.

Many students of all grades attend private schools in Fall River, including Bishop Connolly High School. There are no private schools in the town.

The new (and renamed) regional school opened in late August 2014. Projected costs for the new Somerset-Berkley Regional High School are now at $81.5 million to $83.8 million, notably higher than earlier estimates after planners found that more costs than they had believed wouldn't be reimbursed by the state. The school was built just behind the old high school, atop the former location of the soccer fields and tennis courts. The football field and running track were completely refurbished and completed before the start of the school year. The first graduating class will be the class of 2015. The original high school building was set to be demolished in late 2014, and on its former site will be a new series of fields for student use.

Notable people
 Beatrice Arbour, All-American Girls Professional Baseball League player
 Pamela Bustin, 1996 Olympic field hockey player
 Alan Chebot, Television producer and director
 Alice DeCambra, All-American Girls Professional Baseball League player 
 Lillian DeCambra, All-American Girls Professional Baseball League player
 Shirley May France, attempted to swim the English Channel in 1949 and 1950
 Greg Gagne, Major League Baseball shortstop for two Minnesota Twins world championship teams
 Jonathan Girard, an orchestra and opera conductor
 Clifford Milburn Holland, chief engineer and namesake of the Holland Tunnel in New York City
 Rhoda Leonard, All-American Girls Professional Baseball League player
 Nancy Pimental, actress, and screenwriter, who wrote the script for the film The Sweetest Thing
 Stephen Rebello, writer and screenwriter known for such books as Alfred Hitchcock and the Making of Psycho and for the screenplay of Hitchcock, based on that book
 Jerry Remy, Major League Baseball second baseman for the California Angels and Boston Red Sox; longtime Red Sox color commentator for NESN
 Janet L. Robinson, former president and CEO of The New York Times

References

External links

 Town of Somerset official website

 
1677 establishments in Massachusetts
Populated coastal places in Massachusetts
Providence metropolitan area
Towns in Bristol County, Massachusetts
Towns in Massachusetts